Ron Christopher Stone (born July 20, 1971) is a former American football offensive lineman in the National Football League (NFL) for the Dallas Cowboys, New York Giants, San Francisco 49ers and Oakland Raiders. He played college football at Boston College.

Early years
Stone attended West Roxbury High School and did not play football until his junior year. He was a team captain and blocked 3 punts as a senior. He also played basketball as a senior.

He accepted a football scholarship from Boston College, to play under head coach Jack Bicknell. He was suspended because of academic reasons and didn't see the field until 1990, appearing in 8 games at defensive tackle with 19 tackles, despite missing that last 3 contests due to a fractured right ring finger.

In 1991, Tom Coughlin took over the team's coaching duties. Stone started 11 games at right defensive tackle, registering 49 tackles (5 for loss), one sack, 2 passes defensed and 2 blocked kicks.

As a senior, he was asked to convert into a right tackle to improve the offensive line depth. The line was nicknamed the "All State Insurance". He helped the offense rank 12th in the nation, averaging 233.5 rushing yards per game, rank l0th in total offense with an average of 438.4 yards per game and surrender only 12 sacks

Professional career

Dallas Cowboys
Stone was selected by the Dallas Cowboys in the fourth round (96th overall) of the 1993 NFL Draft and was switched to play at offensive guard. He was activated for only 4 games as a rookie. The next year, he saw most of his playing time on the field goal and extra point lines.

During his time with the team he was a backup at guard and tackle. In 1994, during a playoff game against the Green Bay Packers, injuries forced him to play two different positions along the offensive line. Although he was a talented player and the top offensive line backup, he couldn't start ahead of the team's other offensive guards that included: Nate Newton, Larry Allen, Kevin Gogan, John Gesek and Derek Kennard. He was a part of 2 Super Bowl winning teams.

New York Giants
On March 1, 1996, the New York Giants signed him as an unrestricted free agent, when the Cowboys couldn´t match an offer that would pay him, more than any of the Cowboy starter in the offensive line except for offensive tackle Erik Williams. The contract at the time was criticized, because it was seen as overpaying for a player that was not proven and had no starter experience.

Stone spent 6 seasons with the Giants as the starter at right guard, where he was named to 2 Pro Bowls and 2 All-Pro teams.

San Francisco 49ers
On April 12, 2002, he signed with the San Francisco 49ers as an unrestricted free agent. He was the starter at right guard and made the Pro Bowl in his first year, despite playing the entire season with a right arm brace. In a salary-cap move, he was released on March 2, 2004.

Oakland Raiders
On March 8, 2004, he signed with the Oakland Raiders, reuniting with former offensive coordinator Norv Turner, who was now the head coach of the team. He only started 5 games because of a left knee injury and was placed on the injured reserve list on December 31. 

On March 4, 2005, he was waived and later re-signed on March 10. After starting all 16 games in the previous season, he was released on March 2, 2006.

Personal life
Stone is currently the offensive line coach for Valley Christian High School.

References

External links
Boston College bio

1971 births
Living people
Players of American football from Boston
American football offensive guards
American football offensive tackles
Boston College Eagles football players
Dallas Cowboys players
New York Giants players
San Francisco 49ers players
Oakland Raiders players
National Conference Pro Bowl players